Fort Saint Louis was a slave fort built by the  Compagnie du Sénégal  in Saint Louis, Senegal in 1659.

The fort was captured by Henry Marsh on 1 May, 1758 during the British Capture of Senegal.

References

Buildings and structures in Saint-Louis, Senegal
French slave trade
Forts in Senegal
Buildings and structures completed in 1659
1659 establishments in Africa